Kanthapuram A. P. Aboobacker Musliyar known as Sheikh Abubakr Ahmad (Born as A. P. Aboobacker at Kanthapuram on 22 March 1931) is the tenth and current Grand Mufti of India. He is also the Chancellor of the Jamia Markaz, Chairman of the Siraj Daily and General Secretary of the All India Sunni Jamiyyathul Ulama (the Indian Muslim Scholars Association).

Grand Mufti of India
Musliyar was chosen as the Grand Mufti of India by the All India Tanzeem Ulamae Islam in a programme conducted at Ramlila Maidan after the death of Grand Mufti Akhtar Raza Khan, following an illness on 20 July 2018. The inauguration took place on Sunday, February 24, 2019. It set a record attendance for any event held in Ramlila Maidan.

After his election conducted several receptions in various countries including UAE, Bahrain, Kuwait, Oman, Malaysia and Indonesia especially at his birthplace in India, Kozhikode. Speaker of the Kerala Legislative Assembly Sri P. Sreeramakrishnan, Kerala Minister TP Ramakrishnan, Karnataka Ministers UT Khader and Rahim Khan, and A Pradeepkumar member of 14th Kerala Legislative Assembly, Kerala Haj Committee chairman C Mohammed Faizi, Tamil Nadu Haj Committee chairman Haji Abdul Jabbar, Mayor of Kozhikode Thottathil Raveendran, Zamorin K.C. Unniyanujan Raja and Dr MGS Narayanan, politicians, religious and cultural leaders including from other Indian states participated in the civil reception. In the function, Minister T. P. Ramakrishnan expressed appreciations to the Grand Mufti for the Government of Kerala. You have got a golden visa for 10 years from the Dubai government, you are the first Muslim in India to get this honor.

Peace and interfaith dialogue work
Musliyar has conducted and attended many national and international conferences for peace and interfaith dialogue.

He is the Chairman of the Sheikh Zayed International Peace Conference and was one of the speakers at the First World Tolerance Summit, conducted by the International Institute for Tolerance Dubai, UAE. The tagline of the second Sheikh Zayed International Peace Conference was "Renaissance of the World Through Peace". In 2019 he attended Global Conference of Human Fraternity and met with Pope Francis, head of the Catholic Church.

In 2014 he launched a campaign to plant 100,000 trees throughout India as part of preparations for the Sheikh Zayed International Peace Conference, held in New Delhi.

Educational revivalist

Musliyar educated several scholars from different parts of India. He is involved with Markaz Knowledge City, Unani Medical College, and with higher education and research. He said in an interview with Khaleej Times that the "Education is key to peace".

Views
Musliyar has condemned Islamic extremism. He says that "Militant groups such as the Islamic State (IS) are trying to defame a religion that advocates peace and tolerance." In November 2015, he commented on gender equality, saying: "Gender equality is something which is never going to be a reality. It is against Islam, humanity and was intellectually wrong." He said, “only woman can give birth.” But some media misquoted him as saying women are capable only of childbirth.

Fatwa against ISIS
Musliyar was the first to issue a fatwa against ISIS.  Musliyar issued his Fatwa on ISIS on 27 August 2014 CE.  This is the first fatwa—a nonbinding legal opinion in Islamic law—issued against ISIS according to Ashwani Kumar writing in Khaleej Times.  The document, a copy of which is held in the United Arab Emirates National Archives, was a commission to all Indian Sunni Jamiyyathul Ulama to raise awareness against terrorism.  At the time of the fatwa, Abubakr did not hold the title of Grand Mufti since his election to the office came on 24 February 2019.  He has also issued fatwas a second time against ISIS and against other  terrorist groups.

On CAB and CAA
Musliyar opposed the Citizenship Amendment Bill and Citizenship Amendment Act, and he organised and attended in many protests against the act. He did not support the hartal was organised by SDPI and said the hartal is needless. He visited the family members of protesters killed in police firing at Mangalore to express his condolences.

On Babri Masjid Verdict
Musliyar appealed to the Islamic Community of India to welcome the Supreme Court verdict in the Babri Masjid dispute case before the verdict and accepted after. He said "We respect the Supreme Court. Everyone must strive for peace in India. The victory or defeat over the Babri Masjid incident may be significant to every party, but the protection of India and its sovereignty is much more important." "Babri Masjid is a place of worship for Muslims, but equally important is that all people live peacefully in India."

Citizenship Amendment Act
He met both the Prime Minister of India, Narendra Modi, and Minister of Home Affairs, Amit Shah, at their offices on 20 March 2020 and urged them to amend the Citizenship Amendment Act and National Register of Citizens to remove religion from the list of eligibility criteria for citizenship.

Organisations

In the late 1980 Musliyar was a leader of the Samastha Kerala Jamiat-ul-Ulema together with E. K. Aboobacker Musliyar but due to personality differences chose to split off a group which came to be known as the AP Faction; the residual group becoming referred to as the EK Faction.

Both factions, which are pre-dominately based in Kerela, have set up a set of broadly parallel organisations at both All India and state level, with Musliyar dominant in those of the AP Faction.

In January 2018 committees were formed to re-unite the factions with the objective of re-uniting the groups to achieve an improved political influence,.   there has been no merger.

At the time of his assumption of the title of Grand Mufti of India in February 2019 he was variously described as general secretary of the All-India Muslim Scholars Association for over 25 years, and as general secretary of the All India Sunni Jamiyyathul Ulama.

Honours, awards and international recognition
 Islamic Heritage Award for his service in the protection of Islamic culture and heritage from the Institute of Islamic Heritage, based in the Saudi Arabia. The award was given by the then Minister of Parliamentary Affairs, Vayalar Ravi in January 2008.
 Jewels of World Muslim Biz Award by OIC Today in 2016 from then Malaysian Finance Minister, Johari Abdul Ghani.
 Ras Al Khaimah Islamic Academy Award for the best Social Worker in 1992.
 Indian Islamic Centre Award for outstanding services in the field of Education and Social Services.
 Hamil Al Gaith International Holy Quran Award in 2005.
 Best Indo-Arab Personality Award in 2006.
 He has consecutively been ranked for many years as an influential Muslim from India by The 500 Most Influential Muslims published by the Royal Islamic Strategic Studies Centre of Jordan.

See also

Muhammad Alawi al-Maliki
Sayyid Abdurrahman Al Bukhari
Habib Ali al-Jifri
Nuh Ha Mim Keller
Abd al-Rahman al-Shaghouri
Shaykh Abdal Hakim Murad
Muhammad Metwali Al-Sha'raawi
Muslim Jamaat

Notes

References

Bibliography

Further reading
 An Interview with Sheikh Abubakr by Ashwani Kumar of Khaleej Times: 
 2009 Edition: 
 2010 Edition: 
 2011 Edition: 
 2012 Edition: 
 2013/14 Edition: 
 2014/15 Edition: 
 2016 Edition: 
 2017 Edition: 
 2018 Edition: 
 2019 Edition: 
 2020 Edition:

External links

 

1931 births
Living people
People from Kozhikode district
Grand Muftis of India
Indian Sunni Muslim scholars of Islam
Indian imams
Indian Sufis
Indian spiritual teachers
Indian Islamic religious leaders
People in interfaith dialogue
Markaz
Leaders of Undivided Samastha
Leaders of Samastha (AP Faction)
20th-century Indian Muslims
21st-century Indian Muslims
20th-century imams
21st-century imams